Chrome Box is a box set by the experimental rock band Chrome, released on December 7, 1982 by Subterranean Records.

Album listing

References 

1982 compilation albums
Chrome (band) compilation albums
Subterranean Records albums